Ivan Bátory (born 3 May 1975) is a Slovak cross-country skier who has competed at the international senior level of cross-country skiing since 1993. He was born in Liptovský Mikuláš and lives in Uhorská Ves. As a cross-country skier, he competed for Štrbské Pleso SC.

Bátory competed in all eight World Ski Championships from 1995 to 2009 (best finish: sixth in 15 km at Val di Fiemme in 2003), all five Winter Olympics from 1994 to 2010 (best result: eighth in team sprint at Turin in 2006), and all three Tour de Ski events from 2006-07 to 2008-09.

Bátory's best World Cup results are three third places from Kiruna (1999, 10 km classical), Davos (2001, 15 km classical), and Beitostølen (2005, 15 km classical). His best World Championships result is sixth place in the 15 km classical event in Val di Fiemme in 2003, and his best Olympic result is eighth place in the team sprint in Turin in 2006.

In 2011, Bátory retired from cross-country skiing.

Cross-country skiing results
All results are sourced from the International Ski Federation (FIS).

World Cup

Individual podiums
3 podiums – (3 )

References

External links
 
 
 

1975 births
Cross-country skiers at the 1994 Winter Olympics
Cross-country skiers at the 1998 Winter Olympics
Cross-country skiers at the 2002 Winter Olympics
Cross-country skiers at the 2006 Winter Olympics
Cross-country skiers at the 2010 Winter Olympics
Living people
Olympic cross-country skiers of Slovakia
Slovak male cross-country skiers
Universiade medalists in cross-country skiing
Sportspeople from Liptovský Mikuláš
Universiade gold medalists for Slovakia
Competitors at the 1997 Winter Universiade
Competitors at the 1999 Winter Universiade